James Lowrey (September 10, 1802 – November 30, 1875) was an American lawyer and politician.

Lowrey, youngest child of Daniel and Anna (Munson) Lowrey, was born in that part of Farmington which is now Plainville, Conn., September 10, 1802.

He graduated from Yale College in 1824.  He went to Wellsboro, Pa., as the principal of the academy, and there studied law, and entered into partnership with Hon. Ellis Lewis. He was at one time a member of the Pennsylvania State Legislature.  He retired from practice several years before his death, and removed to Burlington, N. J., where he died, Nov. 30, 1875, aged 73 years.

In 1830, he married Mary W. Morris (daughter of Samuel Wells Morris), who survived him.

1802 births
1875 deaths
People from Plainville, Connecticut
Yale College alumni
Pennsylvania lawyers
Members of the Pennsylvania General Assembly
19th-century American politicians
19th-century American lawyers